Ambient music is a genre of music that emphasizes tone and atmosphere over traditional musical structure or rhythm. It may lack net composition, beat, or structured melody. It uses textural layers of sound that can reward both passive and active listening and encourage a sense of calm or contemplation. The genre is said to evoke an "atmospheric", "visual", or "unobtrusive" quality. Nature soundscapes may be included, and the sounds of acoustic instruments such as the piano, strings and flute may be emulated through a synthesizer.

The genre originated in the 1960s and 1970s, when new musical instruments were being introduced to a wider market, such as the synthesizer. It was presaged by Erik Satie's furniture music and styles such as musique concrète, minimal music, and German electronic music, but was prominently named and popularized by British musician Brian Eno in 1978 with his album Ambient 1: Music for Airports; Eno opined that ambient music "must be as ignorable as it is interesting". It saw a revival towards the late 1980s with the prominence of house and techno music, growing a cult following by the 1990s. Ambient music may have elements of new-age music and drone music, as some works may use sustained or repeated notes.

Ambient music did not achieve large commercial success, being criticized as everything from "dolled-up new age, [..] to boring and irrelevant technical noodling". Nevertheless, it has attained a certain degree of acclaim throughout the years, especially in the Internet age. Due to its relatively open style, ambient music often takes influences from many other genres, ranging from classical, avant-garde music, folk, jazz, and world music, amongst others.

History

Origins

As an early 20th-century French composer, Erik Satie used such Dadaist-inspired explorations to create an early form of ambient/background music that he labeled "furniture music" (Musique d'ameublement). This he described as being the sort of music that could be played during a dinner to create a background atmosphere for that activity, rather than serving as the focus of attention.

In his own words, Satie sought to create "a music...which will be part of the noises of the environment, will take them into consideration. I think of it as melodious, softening the noises of the knives and forks at dinner, not dominating them, not imposing itself. It would fill up those heavy silences that sometime fall between friends dining together. It would spare them the trouble of paying attention to their own banal remarks. And at the same time it would neutralize the street noises which so indiscreetly enter into the play of conversation. To make such music would be to respond to a need."

According to a 1998 article in The Wire, Blind Willie Johnson's 1928 single "Dark Was the Night, Cold Was the Ground" could be filed under ambient music, deeming it "a piece of country gospel improvisation, slide guitar with vocal hums and moans, but no lyrics."

In 1948, French composer & engineer, Pierre Schaeffer coined the term musique concrète. This experimental style of music used recordings of natural sounds that were then modified, manipulated or effected to create a composition. Shaeffer's techniques of using tape loops and splicing are considered to be the precursor to modern day sampling.

In 1952 John Cage released his famous three-movement composition 4'33 which is a performance of complete silence for four minutes and thirty-three seconds. The piece is intended to capture the ambient sounds of the venue/location of the performance and have that be the music played. Cage has been cited by seminal artists such as Brian Eno as influence.

1960s
In the 1960s, many music groups experimented with unusual methods, with some of them creating what would later be called ambient music.

In the summer of 1962, composers Ramon Sender and Morton Subotnick founded The San Francisco Tape Music Center which functioned both as an electronic music studio and concert venue. Other composers working with tape recorders became members and collaborators including Pauline Oliveros, Terry Riley and Steve Reich. Their compositions, among others, contributed to the development of minimal music (also called minimalism), which shares many similar concepts to ambient music such as repetitive patterns or pulses, steady drones, and consonant harmony.

Many records were released in Europe and the United States of America between the mid-1960s and the mid-1990s that established the conventions of the ambient genre in the anglophone popular music market. Some 1960s records with ambient elements include Music for Yoga Meditation and Other Joys and Music for Zen Meditation by Tony Scott, Soothing Sounds for Baby by Raymond Scott, and the first record of the Environments album series by Irv Teibel.

In the late 1960s, French composer Éliane Radigue composed several pieces by processing tape loops from the feedback between two tape recorders and a microphone. In the 1970s, she then went on to compose similar music almost exclusively with an ARP 2500 synthesiser, and her long, slow compositions have often been compared to drone music. In 1969, the group COUM Transmissions were performing sonic experiments in British art schools. Pearls Before Swine's 1968 album Balaklava features the sounds of birdsong and ocean noise, which were to become tropes of ambient music.

1970s
Developing in the 1970s, ambient music stemmed from the experimental and synthesizer-oriented styles of the period.

Between 1974 and 1976, American composer Laurie Spiegel created her seminal work The Expanding Universe, created on a computer-analog hybrid system called GROOVE. In 1977, her composition, Music of the Spheres was included on Voyager 1 and 2's Golden Record.

In April 1975, Suzanne Ciani gave two performances on her Buchla synthesizer – one at the WBAI Free music store and one at Phil Niblock's loft. These performances were released on an archival album in 2016 entitled Buchla Concerts 1975. According to the record label, these concerts were part live presentation, part grant application and part educational demonstration.

However, it wasn't until Brian Eno coined the term in the mid-70s that ambient music was defined as a genre. Eno went on to record 1975's Discreet Music with this in mind, suggesting that it be listened to at "comparatively low levels, even to the extent that it frequently falls below the threshold of audibility", referring to Satie's quote about his musique d'ameublement.

Other contemporaneous musicians creating ambient-style music at the time included Japanese electronic music composers such as Isao Tomita and Ryuichi Sakamoto as well as the psychoacoustic soundscapes of Irv Teibel's Environments series, and German experimental bands such as Popol Vuh, Cluster, Kraftwerk, Harmonia, Ash Ra Tempel and Tangerine Dream. Mike Orme of Stylus Magazine describes the work of Berlin school musicians as "laying the groundwork" for ambient.

The impact the rise of the synthesizer in modern music had on ambient as a genre cannot be overstated; as Ralf Hutter of early electronic pioneers Kraftwerk said in a 1977 Billboard interview: "Electronics is beyond nations and colors...with electronics everything is possible. The only limit is with the composer".  The Yellow Magic Orchestra developed a distinct style of ambient electronic music that would later be developed into ambient house music.

Brian Eno 

The English producer Brian Eno is credited with coining the term "ambient music" in the mid-1970s. He said other artists had been creating similar music, but that "I just gave it a name. Which is exactly what it needed ... By naming something you create a difference. You say that this is now real. Names are very important." He used the term to describe music that is different from forms of canned music like Muzak.

In the liner notes for his 1978 album Ambient 1: Music for Airports, Eno wrote:
 

Eno, who describes himself as a "non-musician", termed his experiments "treatments" rather than traditional performances.

1980s
In the late 70s, new-age musician Laraaji began busking in New York parks and sidewalks, including Washington Square Park. It was there that Brian Eno heard Laraaji playing and asked him if he'd like to record an album. Day of Radiance released in 1980, was the third album in Eno's Ambient series. Although Laraaji had already recorded a number of albums, this one gave him international recognition. Unlike other albums in the series, Day of Radiance featured mostly acoustic instruments instead of electronics.

In the mid-1980s, the possibilities to create a sonic landscape increased through the use of sampling.  By the late 1980s, there was a steep increase in the incorporation of the computer in the writing and recording process of records. The sixteen-bit Macintosh platform with built-in sound and comparable IBM models would find themselves in studios and homes of musicians and record makers.

However, many artists were still working with analogue synthesizers and acoustic instruments to produce ambient works.

In 1983, Midori Takada recorded her first solo LP Through the Looking Glass in two days. She performed all parts on the album, with diverse instrumentation including percussion, marimba, gong, reed organ, bells, ocarina, vibraphone, piano and glass Coca-Cola bottles.

Between 1988 and 1993 Éliane Radigue produced three hour-long works on the ARP 2500 which were subsequently issued together as La Trilogie De La Mort.

Also in 1988, founding member and director of the San Francisco Tape Music Centre, Pauline Oliveros coined the term "deep listening" after she recorded an album inside a huge underground cistern in Washington which has a 45-second reverberation time. The concept of Deep Listening then went on to become "an aesthetic based upon principles of improvisation, electronic music, ritual, teaching and meditation".

1990s
By the early 1990s, artists such as the Orb, Aphex Twin, Seefeel, the Irresistible Force, Biosphere, and the Higher Intelligence Agency gained commercial success and were being referred to by the popular music press as ambient house, ambient techno, IDM or simply "ambient". The term chillout emerged from British ecstasy culture which was originally applied in relaxed downtempo "chillout rooms" outside of the main dance floor where ambient, dub and downtempo beats were played to ease the tripping mind.

London artists such as Aphex Twin (specifically: Selected Ambient Works Volume II, 1994), Global Communication (76:14, 1994), The Future Sound of London (Lifeforms, 1994, ISDN, 1994), the Black Dog (Temple of Transparent Balls, 1993), Autechre (Incunabula, 1993, Amber, 1994), Boards of Canada, and The KLF's Chill Out, (1990), all took a part in popularising and diversifying ambient music where it was used as a calming respite from the intensity of the hardcore and techno popular at that time.

Other global ambient artists from the 1990s include American composers Stars of the Lid (who released 5 albums during this decade), and Japanese artist Susumu Yokota whose album Sakura (1999) featured what Pitchfork magazine called "dreamy, processed guitar as a distinctive sound tool".

2000s–present

By the late 2000s and 2010s, ambient music also gained widespread recognition on YouTube, with uploaded pieces, usually ranging from 1 to 8 hours long, getting over millions of hits. Such videos are usually titled, or are generally known as, "relaxing music", and may be influenced by other music genres. Ambient videos assist online listeners with yoga, study, sleep (see music and sleep), massage, meditation and gaining optimism, inspiration, and creating peaceful atmosphere in their rooms or other environments.
Many uploaded ambient videos tend to be influenced by biomusic where they feature sounds of nature, though the sounds would be modified with reverbs and delay units to make spacey versions of the sounds as part of the ambience. Such natural sounds oftentimes include those of a beach, rainforest, thunderstorm and rainfall, among others, with vocalizations of animals such as bird songs being used as well. Pieces containing binaural beats are common and popular uploads as well, which provide music therapy and stress management for the listener.

Verified YouTube channels, such as aptly titled Ambient has over 500,000 subscribers. Other verified channels that also publish ambient music include, Meditation Relax Music, which has over two million subscribers, Soothing Relaxation with more than eight million subscribers, and Relaxing White Noise with over 500,000 subscribers, among others. iTunes and Spotify have digital radio stations that feature ambient music, which are mostly produced by independent labels.

Acclaimed ambient music of this era (according to Pitchfork magazine) include works by Max Richter, Julianna Barwick, Grouper, William Basinski, Oneohtrix Point Never, and the Caretaker. In 2011, American composer Liz Harris recording as Grouper released the album AIA: Alien Observer, listed by Pitchfork at number 21 on their "50 Best Ambient Albums of All Time". In 2011, Julianna Barwick released her first full-length album The Magic Place. Heavily influenced by her childhood experiences in a church choir, Barwick loops her wordless vocals into ethereal soundscapes. It was listed at number 30 on Pitchfork's 50 Best Ambient Albums of All Time. After several self-released albums, Buchla composer, producer and performer Kaitlyn Aurelia Smith was signed to independent record label Western Vinyl in 2015. In 2016, she released her second official album EARS. It paired the Buchla synthesizer with traditional instruments and her compositions were compared to Laurie Spiegel and Alice Coltrane. Kaitlyn has also collaborated with other well-known Buchla performer, Suzanne Ciani. Iggy Pop's 2019 album Free features ambient soundscapes. Mallsoft, a subgenre of vaporwave, features various ambient influences, with artists such as Cat System Corp. and Groceries exploring ambient sounds typical of malls and grocery stores.

Related and derivative genres

Ambient dub 

Ambient dub is a fusion of ambient music with dub. The term was first coined by Birmingham's now defunct label "Beyond Records" in early 1990s. The label released series of albums Ambient Dub Volume 1 to 4 that inspired many artists, including Bill Laswell, who used the same phrase in his music project Divination, where he collaborated with other artists in the genre. Ambient dub adopts dub styles made famous by King Tubby and other Jamaican sound artists from the 1960s to the early 1970s, using DJ-inspired ambient electronica, complete with all the inherent drop-outs, echo, equalization and psychedelic electronic effects. It often features layering techniques and incorporates elements of world music, deep bass lines and harmonic sounds. According to David Toop, "Dub music is like a long echo delay, looping through time...turning the rational order of musical sequences into an ocean of sensation." Notable artists within the genre include Dreadzone, Higher Intelligence Agency, The Orb, Gaudi, Ott, Loop Guru, Woob and Transglobal Underground as well as Banco de Gaia and Leyland Kirby

Ambient house 

Ambient house is a musical category founded in the late 1980s that is used to describe acid house featuring ambient music elements and atmospheres. Tracks in the ambient house genre typically feature four-on-the-floor beats, synth pads, and vocal samples integrated in an atmospheric style. Ambient house tracks generally lack a diatonic center and feature much atonality along with synthesized chords. The Dutch Brainvoyager is an example of this genre. Illbient is another form of ambient house music.

Ambient techno 

Ambient techno is a music category emerging in the late 1980s that is used to describe ambient music atmospheres with the rhythmic and melodic elements of techno. Notable artists include Aphex Twin, B12, Autechre, and the Black Dog.

Ambient industrial 
Ambient industrial is a hybrid genre of industrial and ambient music. A "typical" ambient industrial work (if there is such a thing) might consist of evolving dissonant harmonies of metallic drones and resonances, extreme low frequency rumbles and machine noises, perhaps supplemented by gongs, percussive rhythms, bullroarers, distorted voices or anything else the artist might care to sample (often processed to the point where the original sample is no longer recognizable). Entire works may be based on radio telescope recordings, the babbling of newborn babies, or sounds recorded through contact microphones on telegraph wires.

Ambient pop 
Ambient pop is a musical genre that developed in the 1980s as an extension of the dream pop movement. It merges structures that are common to conventional pop music with "electronic textures and atmospheres that mirror the hypnotic, meditative qualities of ambient music." Ambient pop employs the lock-groove melodies of Krautrock as an influence. Despite being an extension of the dream pop movement, it is distinguished by its adoption of "contemporary electronic idioms, including sampling, although for the most part live instruments continue to define the sound."

David Bowie was among the first rock and pop artists to experiment with ambient music, particularly on his Berlin Trilogy with ambient music pioneer Brian Eno. The track "Red Sails" from the trilogy's third album, Lodger was described as a "piece of ambient pop with Motorik beat." English art rock band Japan's song "Taking Islands in Africa" from Gentlemen Take Polaroids (1980) is regarded by AllMusic critic Stewart Mason as a forecast of "the ambient pop direction Japan (and leader David Sylvian) would take for the rest of their careers." Featuring the Yellow Magic Orchestra leader Ryuichi Sakamoto, the track employed "a very non-rock African talking drum rhythm, slowed down to a sub-heartbeat crawl and overlaid with layers of atmospheric keyboards and minimal bass."

Dream pop band Slowdive's 1995 Pygmalion album heavily incorporated elements of ambient electronica, influencing many bands of the genre. Pitchfork critic Nitsuh Abebe described the album's tracks as "ambient pop dreams that have more in common with post-rock like Disco Inferno than shoegazers like Ride".

Dark ambient 

Brian Eno's original vision of ambient music as unobtrusive musical wallpaper, later fused with warm house rhythms and given playful qualities by the Orb in the 1990s, found its opposite in the style known as dark ambient. Populated by a wide assortment of personalities—ranging from older industrial and metal experimentalists (Scorn's Mick Harris, Current 93's David Tibet, Nurse with Wound's Steven Stapleton) to electronic boffins (Kim Cascone/PGR, Psychick Warriors Ov Gaia), Japanese noise artists (K.K. Null, Merzbow), and latter-day indie rockers (Main, Bark Psychosis) – dark ambient features toned-down or entirely missing beats with unsettling passages of keyboards, eerie samples, and treated guitar effects. Like most styles related in some way to electronic/dance music of the '90s, it's a very nebulous term; many artists enter or leave the style with each successive release. Related styles include ambient industrial (see below) and isolationist ambient.

Space music 

Space music, also spelled "Spacemusic", includes music from the ambient genre as well as a broad range of other genres with certain characteristics in common to create the experience of contemplative spaciousness.

Space music ranges from simple to complex sonic textures sometimes lacking conventional melodic, rhythmic, or vocal components, generally evoking a sense of "continuum of spatial imagery and emotion", beneficial introspection, deep listening and sensations of floating, cruising or flying.

Space music is used by individuals for both background enhancement and foreground listening, often with headphones, to stimulate relaxation, contemplation, inspiration and generally peaceful expansive moods and soundscapes. Space music is also a component of many film soundtracks and is commonly used in planetariums, as a relaxation aid and for meditation.

Notable ambient-music shows 

 Sirius XM Chill plays ambient, chillout and downtempo electronica.
 Sirius XM Spa blends ambient and new age instrumental music on channel XM 68.
 Echoes, a daily two-hour music radio program hosted by John Diliberto featuring a soundscape of ambient, spacemusic, electronica, new acoustic and new music directions – founded in 1989 and syndicated on 130 radio stations in the USA.
 Hearts of Space, a program hosted by Stephen Hill and broadcast on NPR in the US since 1973.
 Musical Starstreams, a US-based commercial radio station and Internet program produced, programmed and hosted by Forest since 1981.
 Star's End, a radio show on 88.5 WXPN, in Philadelphia, Pennsylvania. Founded in 1976, it is the second longest-running ambient music radio show in the world.
 Ultima Thule Ambient Music, a weekly 90-minute show broadcast since 1989 on community radio across Australia.
 Avaruusromua, the name meaning "space debris", is a 60-minute ambient and avant-garde radio program broadcast since 1990 on Finnish public broadcaster YLE's various stations.

See also

Notes

References

External links 
 
 Ambient Techno in Sound on Sound
 Ambient Music Guide – Comprehensive ambient music resource site 

 
Easy listening music
Electronic music genres
British styles of music
Radio formats
1960s in music